Dutluca is a village in the Burhaniye district of Balıkesir Province in Turkey.

References

Villages in Burhaniye District